Imouzzer Marmoucha is a town in Boulemane Province, Fès-Meknès, Morocco. According to the 2004 census it has a population of 4,001.

References

External links

Populated places in Boulemane Province
Municipalities of Morocco